Arabella was a German talk show hosted by Arabella Kiesbauer airing on the German television network ProSieben from 1994 to 2004.  It was modelled after The Oprah Winfrey Show.

1994 German television series debuts
2004 German television series endings
German television talk shows
ProSieben original programming
German-language television shows